There are many products based on FreeBSD.  Information about these products and the version of FreeBSD they are based on is often difficult to come by, since this fact is not widely publicised.

Libre software and hardware using free software
 BSDRP – BSD Router Project: Open Source Router Distribution
 ClonOS – FreeBSD based distro for virtual hosting platform and appliance.
 Darwin – The UNIX-based, open-source foundation of Mac OS X
 DesktopBSD – KDE-based desktop-oriented distribution
 DragonFlyBSD – FreeBSD independent fork
 FreeSBIE – Live CD
 GhostBSD – GTK-based distribution, that defaults Xfce and MATE as GUI
 HardenedBSD – HardenedBSD is a security-enhanced fork of FreeBSD.
 helloSystem – helloSystem is a desktop system for creators with a focus on simplicity, elegance, and usability.
 ravynOS - an OS aimed to provide the finesse of macOS with the freedom of FreeBSD.
 iXsystems 
 TrueNAS storage appliances were based on FreeBSD 10.3
 TrueNAS CORE (formerly known as FreeNAS)
 TrueNAS Enterprise
 TrueOS – discontinued FreeBSD distribution aimed at the server market, previously a desktop distribution.
 MidnightBSD — A GNUstep-based independent fork of FreeBSD for desktops, however installer is not graphical
 MyBee – Open source and free distribution for managing containers (FreeBSD jail) and cloud VMs (Bhyve) through a simplified API.
 m0n0wall – Embedded firewall software package
 NAS4Free – Open source storage platform
 NomadBSD – a persistent live system for USB flash drives, based on FreeBSD.
 OPNsense – Open source and free firewall, fork of pfSense and successor to m0n0wall
 pfSense – Open source and free network firewall distribution

Proprietary software and hardware using proprietary software
 Beckhoff TwinCAT/BSD for Industrial PCs
 Blue Coat Systems network appliances
 Borderware appliances (firewall, VPN, Anti-SPAM, Web filter etc.) are based on a FreeBSD kernel
 Check Point IPSO security appliances
 Citrix Systems Netscaler application delivery software is based on FreeBSD
 Coyote Point GX-series web acceleration and load balancer appliances
 Dell Compellent enterprise storage systems (all 64-bit versions)
 Halon SMTP server 3.4 is based on FreeBSD 10.2
 Hobnob WirelessWAN
 IronPort AsyncOS is based on a FreeBSD kernel
 Isilon Systems' OneFS, the operating system used on Isilon IQ-series clustered storage systems
 Juniper Networks Junos
 Junos prior to 5.0 was based on FreeBSD 2.2.6
 Junos between 5.0 and 7.2 (inclusive) is based on FreeBSD 4.2
 Junos 7.3 and higher is based on FreeBSD 4.10
 Junos 8.5 is based on FreeBSD 6.1
 Junos 15.1 is based on FreeBSD 10
 Junos 18.1 is based on FreeBSD 11
 KACE Networks's KBOX 1000 & 2000 Series Appliances and the Virtual KBOX Appliance
 Lynx Software Technologies LynxOS, uses FreeBSD's networking stack
 McAfee SecurOS, used in e.g. Firewall Enterprise (aka Sidewinder)
 NetApp filers based on Data ONTAP
 Netflix Open Connect appliances
 Nintendo Switch games console.
 Panasas parallel network storage systems
 Panasonic uses FreeBSD in their Viera TV receivers
 QNAP's QES operating system
 Sandvine's network policy control products
 Silicon Graphics International uses FreeBSD in their ArcFiniti MAID disk arrays, formerly manufactured by COPAN.
 Sony Computer Entertainment's PlayStation 3, PlayStation 4  and PlayStation Vita consumer gaming consoles.
 Sophos Email Appliance
 Spectra Logic nTier Verde backup appliances
 Symmetricom Timing Solutions
 The Weather Channel's IntelliStar local forecast computer
 WhatsApp
 Xinuos OpenServer 10

References 

FreeBSD based products
FreeBSD